St. Peter's Evangelical Lutheran Church is a historic Lutheran church at Broad and Mullberry Streets in Lancaster, Ohio.

It was built in 1879 and added to the National Register of Historic Places in 1979.

References

Lutheran churches in Ohio
Churches on the National Register of Historic Places in Ohio
Gothic Revival church buildings in Ohio
Churches completed in 1879
Buildings and structures in Fairfield County, Ohio
National Register of Historic Places in Fairfield County, Ohio